Kamnica may refer to: 

In Poland:
Kamnica, Poland, a village in the Miastko district of Bytów County, Pomeranian Voivodeship

In Slovenia:
Kamnica, Dol pri Ljubljani, a village in the Municipality of Dol pri Ljubljani
Kamnica, Maribor, a village in the City Municipality of Maribor